The Dakar Biennale 1990 is the first edition of the Dakar Biennale organised in Dakar in Senegal in 1990 and focused on literature.

The biennale is opened in Dakar with the title Biennale des Lettres (Biennale of literature) and is focused on Aires Culturelles et Création Littéraire en Afrique (Cultural zones and literary production in Africa).

Programme 
The biennale consists of a debate structured in four workshops. At the centre of the attention there are both national literature and a pan-African approach, capable of linking and strengthening the production of the African continent and its diaspora. Languages, genres, aesthetic concerns and cultural networks are themes which emerge from the presentations. The event is dedicated to Léopold Sédar Senghor – first president of Senegal (1960–1980) – who participates to the opening and who is called by its successor Abdou Diouf Monsieur le Président.

During the biennale take place also music, theatre and dance events and several exhibitions. The Dakar National Gallery shows around 100 artworks from the national collection of art; the Village de la Biennale de Dakar – build for the event – hosts a series of stands with exhibition-selling of artwork produced by Senegalese artists.

Bibliography 

 Biennale des Lettres Dakar 12-18 Décembre 1990, Colloque International "Aires Culturelles et Création Littéraire en Afrique", Les Nouvelles Editions Africaines du Sénégal, Agence de Coopération Culturelle et Technique, Dakar, 1991.
 Isabelle Bosman, Dak’Art 96 – Troisième èdition de la Biennale de Dakar – Etude d’evaluation (rapport intermédiaire), Dakar, gennaio 1997.
 Alioune Badiane, Rapport du Seminaire International d’evaluation de Dak’Art 96, Dakar, 02-03/04/1997.
 Iolanda Pensa, La Biennale di Dakar, tesi di laurea, relatore Luciano Caramel e correlatore Francesco Tedeschi, Università Cattolica di Milano, Laurea in lettere e filosofia, 2003 (CC-BY-SA).
 Iolanda Pensa, La Biennale de Dakar comme projet de coopération et de développement, tesi di dottorato in Anthropologie sociale et ethnologie e in Governo e progettazione del territorio, Ecole des Hautes Etudes en Sciences Sociales in co-tutela con il Politecnico di Milano, Dipartimento di Architettura e Pianificazione, direttori di ricerca Jean-Loup Amselle in co-tutela con Rossella Salerno; giuria Jean-Loup Amselle, Elio Grazioli, Rossella Salerno, Tobias Wendl, Parigi, 27/06/2011. CC BY-SA.
 Elizabeth Harney, In Senghor's Shadow : Art, Politics, and the Avant-Garde in Senegal, 1960-1995, Duke University Press, Durham, 2004.
 Tracy D. Snipe, Arts and Politics in Senegal 1960-1996, Africa World Press, Trenton (NJ) / Asmara, 1998.
 Dak’Art 2002: 5ème Biennale de l’Art Africain Contemporain (cat. expo), La Biennale des Arts de Dakar, Dakar, 2002
 Dak'Art 2010: 9ème Biennale de l'art africain contemporain (cat. expo.), Dakar, 2010.
 Daniel Sotiaux, Questions à Rémi Sagna su Dak'Art in "Africa e Mediterraneo", dossier Sulla storia dell'arte africana contemporanea, (dir.) Iolanda Pensa and Sandra Federici, n. 55, 01/2006, p. 35-38.
 Daniel Sotiaux, Dak'art Chronologie in "Africa e Mediterraneo", dossier Sulla storia dell'arte africana contemporanea, eds. Iolanda Pensa and Sandra Federici, n. 55, 01/2006, p. 39-42.
 Rémi Sagna and N'Goné Fall, Dak'art. Témoignages in "Africa e Mediterraneo", dossier Sulla storia dell'arte africana contemporanea, eds. Iolanda Pensa and Sandra Federici, n. 55, 01/2006, p. 43-49.

See also 
 Dakar Biennale
 Dak'Art 1992. First edition focused on visual art.
 Dak'Art 1996. First edition focused on Contemporary African Art.
 Dak'Art 1998. Third edition.
 Dak'Art 2000. Fourth edition.
 Dak'Art 2002. Fifth edition.
 Dak'Art 2004. Sixth edition.
 Dak'Art 2006. Seventh edition and first edition with an artistic director.
 Dak'Art 2008. Eighth edition.
 Dak'Art 2010. Ninth edition.

External links 
Dakar Biennale website dakart.org

Dakar Biennale
1990 in art
1990 in Senegal